José Costa may refer to:

 José Costa (footballer, born 1953), Portuguese winger and manager
 José Costa (footballer, born 1994), Portuguese goalkeeper
 José Costa (sailor) (born 1984), Portuguese sailor
 José Horácio Costa, president of the Brazilian state of Espírito Santo
 José Palhares Costa (1908–1976) Portuguese hurdler
 José Ramos Costa (1926–1989), president of Valencia CF
 José da Costa (volleyball) (born 1941), Brazilian volleyball player
 José da Costa (footballer) (born 1928), Portuguese footballer
 José Xavier Costa (born 1980), Brazilian footballer 
 José Costa (basketball)
 José Costa (athlete)
 José Costa (judge)